The Auburn–Clemson football rivalry is an American college football rivalry between the Auburn Tigers and Clemson Tigers.

Series history
The rivalry began in 1899 and was played almost annually up until 1929. It was renewed in 1940 on an annual basis until 1955, with only a three-year break from 1943–45 for World War II. After that, the series became much more intermittent. They have faced each other in two bowl games; the 1998 Peach Bowl and the 2007 Chick-fil-A Bowl.

Notable games

1998 Peach Bowl

2007 Chick-fil-A Bowl

Game results

See also  
 List of NCAA college football rivalry games

References

College football rivalries in the United States
Auburn Tigers football
Clemson Tigers football